Patricia Berne is an author, artist, film director, disability rights activist and co-founder of Sins Invalid, a disability justice-based performance project that incubates artists with disabilities, centralizing artists of color and LGBTQ/gender-variant artists. They are a founder member of the disability justice movement.

Career 
Berne is the Executive Director and Artistic Director of Sins Invalid and a Fellow of the Ford Foundation's Disability Futures Forum. Their work spans advocacy for immigrants and asylum seekers, community organising with the Haitian diaspora, supporting survivors of state and interpersonal violence through trauma focused clinical psychology, working alongside young people in the prison system to imagine alternatives to criminal legal systems and championing disability, and LGBTQI perspectives in reproductive genetic technologies. 

Berne is a prolific contributor to the public discourse about disability justice.

References

External links 

 Sins Invalid official website
 Disability Visibility Project interview with Patty Berne
 Crip Bits: Dialogues on Liberation & the Body with Patricia Berne

American disability rights activists
Year of birth missing (living people)
Living people